Millsdale station was an Atchison, Topeka and Santa Fe Railway station in the ghost town of Millsdale, Illinois. It was located on the east bank of the Des Plaines River, and had two tracks passing through. The station is on the BNSF Chillicothe Subdivision and freight trains still pass by the site of the former depot.

References

Atchison, Topeka and Santa Fe Railway stations
Former railway stations in Illinois
Railway stations in Will County, Illinois